Etcheverry is a Basque surname and may refer to:

People
Andrea Echeverri (born 1965), Colombian singer-songwriter
Eduardo Etcheverry, Uruguayan chess master
Héctor Echeverri (1938–1988), Colombian footballer
Juan Carlos Echeverry (disambiguation), multiple people
Oscar Echeverry (born 1977), Colombian footballer
Adriana Vacarezza Etcheverry (born 1961), Chilean actress
Marcela Vacarezza Etcheverry (born 1970), Chilean television presenter, Miss Chile 1992
Gary Etcheverry (born 1956), professional football coach
Guillermo Jaim Etcheverry (born 1942), Argentine physician
Jésus Etcheverry (1911–1988), French opera conductor
Marco Etcheverry (born 1970), Bolivian soccer player
María Eugenia Etcheverry, Uruguayan military pilot
Sam Etcheverry (1930–2009), Canadian football player/coach
Tomás Martín Etcheverry (born 1999), Argentine tennis player
Omar Etcheverry, U.S. Professional Surfer and co-host of radio show The Extreme Scene

See also
Etxeberria, a Basque place name and surname
Echeverría (disambiguation)
Echeverri (disambiguation)

Basque-language surnames